The canton of Saint-Gaultier is an administrative division of the Indre department, central France. Its borders were modified at the French canton reorganisation which came into effect in March 2015. Its seat is in Saint-Gaultier.

It consists of the following communes:
 
Beaulieu
Bélâbre
Bonneuil
Chaillac
Chalais
La Châtre-Langlin
Chazelet
Chitray
Dunet
Lignac
Luant
Luzeret
Mauvières
Méobecq
Migné
Mouhet
Neuillay-les-Bois
Nuret-le-Ferron
Oulches
La Pérouille
Parnac
Prissac
Rivarennes
Roussines
Sacierges-Saint-Martin
Saint-Benoît-du-Sault
Saint-Civran
Saint-Gaultier
Saint-Gilles
Saint-Hilaire-sur-Benaize
Thenay
Tilly
Vendœuvres
Vigoux

References

Cantons of Indre